() is the abbreviation to Commanding officer of the Division, and was a military rank in the Soviet Armed Forces of the USSR in the period from 1935 to 1940. It was also the designation to military personnel appointed to command a division sized formation (XX).

Until 1940, it was the fourth highest military rank of the Red Army, and was equivalent to Division commissar of the political staff in all military branches, Flag Officer 2nd rank in the Soviet navy, or to Senior major of state security. With the reintroduction of regular general ranks in 1940, the designation  was abolished, and replaced by Lieutenant general.

History
This particular rank was introduced by disposal of the Central Executive Committee of the Soviet Union and the Council of People's Commissars, from September 22, 1935.
The new rank structure was as follows:
 Command level Brigade X:  (Brigadier)
 Command level Division XX:  (Division commander)
 Command level Corps XXX:  (Korps commander)
 Command level Field army XXXX: Komandarm 2nd rank (Army commander 2nd rank – Commander Army)
 Command level Army group, Front XXXXX: Komandarm 1st rank (Army commander 1st rank – Frond commander)
 Marshal of the Soviet Union

Rank insignia

See also
Ranks and rank insignia of the Red Army 1935–1940, and ... 1940–1943

References 

Military ranks of the Soviet Union